The Pachpadra Lake is a salt lake near Pachpadra in Barmer District, Rajasthan, India. Its sodium chloride level is marked at 98%.

See also
 List of lakes in India

References

Lakes of Rajasthan
Barmer district
Saline lakes of Asia
Salt industry in India